The Remixes: Miho Nakayama Meets Los Angeles Groove is the third remix album by the Japanese entertainer Miho Nakayama. Released by King Records on January 9, 1998, it is a follow-up to The Remixes: Miho Nakayama Meets New York Groove, with six more remixes of songsselected  from her back catalog.

The album peaked at No. 80 on Oricon's albums chart and sold over 4,000 copies.

Track listing

Charts

References

External links
 
 

1998 remix albums
Miho Nakayama compilation albums
Japanese-language compilation albums
King Records (Japan) compilation albums